Alexander Gschliesser (born 11 May 1973) is an Italian former professional ice hockey player. He has been an assistant coach with the Italian WSV Sterzing Broncos since 2010.

International
Gschliesser competed for Italy in the 1994 Winter Olympics. He also competed for Italy at the 1998 IIHF World Championship.

References

External links

1973 births
Sportspeople from Sterzing
Germanophone Italian people
Brunico SG players
SHC Fassa players
HC Merano players
HC Milano players
Italian ice hockey right wingers
Living people
Ice hockey players at the 1994 Winter Olympics
Olympic ice hockey players of Italy
HC Pustertal Wölfe players
Wipptal Broncos players